Bembidion femoratum is a species of ground beetle native to Europe.

References

femoratum
Beetles described in 1825
Beetles of Europe